, short for Sparkling Prism☆Channel, is a Japanese arcade game by Takara Tomy Arts. It is the successor to Pretty Rhythm, PriPara, Idol Time PriPara and the third entry in Takara Tomy's Pretty Series.

An anime television series adaptation by Tatsunoko Production and DongWoo A&E began airing from April 8, 2018. On April 30, 2021, it was announced the anime was officially ended on May 30, 2021.

Anime-series plot

Season one
"Pri☆Chan" is a video streaming platform where everyone can stream original content and perform as an idol. Using a special device called PriCast, everyone can self-produce and broadcast their own sparkling, exciting channel and become a Pri☆Chan idol. Mirai Momoyama and Emo Moegi, ordinary first-year students at Kirarigaoka Middle School, end up making their own Pri☆Chan debut out of spite towards their selfish, arrogant classmate Anna Akagi, an extremely popular Pri☆Chan idol. In order to upgrade their content, they soon find a new friend who ends up being their producer, a knowledgeable straight-A student Rinka Aoba who joins their group as their manager. The three girls form an idol group called "Miracle☆Kiratts", and together they start producing content of all types while dreaming about becoming top Pri☆Chan Idols.

Season two
As the popularity of Pri☆Chan idol streaming channels has been skyrocketed and going viral on the internet, a virtual idol named "Daia" appears, and everyone is given a Jewel Pact. Along with that, she announces the opening of the "Jewel Auditions", an event where idols with a jewel-like shine are chosen to become "Jewel Idols". Only those who can pass the audition with a sparkling heart can make their "Kiratto Jewel" shine, allowing them to receive their "Jewel Coords". And out of all of them, only the best "Jewel Idol" can wear the long-admired "Diamond Coord", a legendary Jewel Coord that will make the idol into a "Diamond Idol". Who's going to be a "Jewel Idol"?!

Season three
Kirajuku turned into a state-of-the-art virtual theme park called "Pri☆Chan Land"! In addition to that, the Kagayaki Corporation, the group that manages Pri☆Chan Land, announced that they will be holding a "Princess Cup" to determine the next generation's top Pri☆Chan idol! In order to participate in the "Princess Cup", Mirai and the others try to raise their mascots using the new item called the "PriTamaGO" that was given to them! Friends and mascots join forces together to win the "Illuminage Coords" of each area of the amusement park. To win the "Queen's Grand Prix", an idol must become the princess of the most areas to become the "Illuminage Queen" and receive the "Castle Coord", they will perform for the greatest parade in Pri☆Chan Castle! The girls in Kirajuku have become very interested! Who will win the title of "Illuminage Queen"...!?

Characters

Playable characters

Miracle☆Kiratts 

A first-year student in Kirarigaoka Middle School in Season 1, later turns into second-year in Season 2 and third-year in Season 3. While she has a curious spirit, she is nevertheless introverted, and dislikes being the center of attention. She likes drawing poorly drawn but charming illustrations. Her catch phrase is "Kiratto" (Sparkling). She's a lovely type idol, her theme color is pink and her preferred brand is Sweet Honey.

Mirai's best friend and classmate. She is free-spirited and good at sports, and is the type to not look before she leaps. She is very well-informed and updated on the latest trends, but she can also be very fickle. She also a member of her school's cheerleading squad. Her catchphrase is "Emoi" (roughly translating to "Good vibes"). She's a pop type idol, her theme color is yellow and her preferred brand is Girls' Yell.

Mirai's classmate. She is very calm, collected and knowledgeable. While she is a quiet, smart and excellent straight-A student, she somehow knows a lot about Pri☆Chan, and acts as a supporter and manager to Mirai and Emo. When she was little, she and her brother often pretend to have PriCasts and record each other, as if they had their own Pri☆Chan to post on. When Yuzuru started to hang out with other kids, they eventually stopped doing this, which caused Rinka tends to cry a bit due to the rift between them. She later debuted as the third member of Miracle☆Kiratts. She's a Cool type idol, her theme color is blue and her preferred brand is Secret Alice.

Meltic StAr 

Mirai's schoolmate in the same grade but different class. She comes from a rich family and is the heiress to her family business, The Akagi Property. In her self-produced video channel, she acts like a celebrity but often slips up. She frequently meddles in Emo's business and argues with her. She's a lovely type idol, her theme color is red and her preferred brand is Dolly Waltz.

Anna's classmate and also friend since childhood. She is Anna's close friend, and a cool tomboy. She is always right by Anna's side and usually has to restrain Anna from her wild antics. She's a cool type idol, her theme color is green and her preferred brand is Romance Beat.

Debuted in Episode 23. She is very energetic and also very funny. Despite in the same year with Mirai, she is very smart and has already competed her bachelor degree in America. She returns to be Anna's classmate and forms Meltic Star once again after five years absence. She's a cool type idol, her theme color is purple and her preferred brand is Universe Queen.

iL'ange 

A top idol. She normally wears disguises and often spends her time wandering through town and frequently indulges in various activities the girls are partaking in. In Season 3, she serve as judge of the Queen's Grand Prix. She is a premium-type idol, her theme color is white and her preferred brand is Precious Muse.

Sweet Honey's Brand Designer who is the member of Designers Thirteen. She is the parallel version of Aira Harune from Pretty Rhythm: Aurora Dream.

Ring Marry 

Debuted in Season 2. Mirai's schoolmate since her second year in middle school. She likes everything that is cute and owns the program "Cutie Committee" to introduce all kinds of cute things on earth. She's a Lovely-type idol, her theme color is gold and her preferred brand is Cutie Happiness.

Debuted in Season 2. Maria's junior and friend and the owner of a dancing program in Pri☆Chan. Although she thought that Maria was troublesome in the first place, she actually cares about her. She was initially reluctant to form a duo with Maria, but gladly agreed later. She's a cool-type idol, her theme color is black and her preferred brand is Dance & Street.

W Daia 

Debuted in Season 2. Mirai's schoolmate during her second year in middle school. She is the creator of the virtual idol DAIA and together they serve as judges at the Jewel Auditions. Initially she was very quiet and shy and tended to run away when someone talked to her. She also had very low self-esteem and doubtful about her possibilities of becoming a Pri☆Chan idol. After meeting Mirai and her friends, she became more confidence and managed to make her idol debut. In Episode 89, she reveals that she is responsible for created Jewel Auditions, so that she could make friends. In Season 3, she and Daia formed an idol duo with their new team name, W Daia, as they participates to entry the Queen's Grand Prix as the new princesses of the Moonlight Magic area. She's a pop type idol, her theme color is rainbow and her preferred brand is Milky Rainbow, a brand which she created.

Debuted in Season 2. A virtual idol who is the host of the Jewel Auditions. She is bright, cheerful, eccentric, and optimistic girl who is very supportive, imaginative, and excitable, often she tends to end her sentences with "~damon". In Episode 54, it is revealed that she was created from Nijinosaki's Design Palette and together they serve as judges at the Jewel Auditions. At first she was best friends with her creator and helped her with her idol "debut", where she was dancing on the stage and Nijinosaki provides the vocals. As Nijinosaki builds more confidence and becomes more self-reliant, Daia begins having an empty feeling, causing an image change within her. After BugcCHU hacks Daia's system causing her to transform into "Another" form, she became rude and mischievous and she seemed to have become somewhat mellow. Along with that, she gained an accent and started ending her sentences with "~dayon". In Episode 100, Daia admits to feeling unneeded due to the fact that Nijinosaki has made so many real friends, she resumes her friendship with Nijinosaki like normal after reverting to her original self. In Episode 101, thanks to Mirai's Diamond Coord, she managed to defeat BugcCHU and this caused Daia turn into a "petite" form due to damage she had taken to her system.

ALIVE 
→

Debuted in Season 3. Mirai's schoolmate during her third year in middle school. A cheerful and lively girl who is a part-time worker of Pri☆Chan Land. She comes from a foreign circus troupe, and came to Japan only to find her long-lost family. In Episode 141, after Solulu regained her memories, she revealed that she actually was Eve's long-lost twin sister. In Episode 142, she taking her position as the CEO of the Kagayaki Corporation alongside her sister as the vice president and also they formed an idol duo under their name ALIVE. She's a natural type idol, her theme color is orange and her preferred brand is Fun Fun Trunk.

Debuted in Season 3. A quiet and lady-like girl who is the CEO of the Kagayaki Corporation as well as Alice's twin sister. She is also responsible for organizing Princess Cup and the opening of the Pri☆Chan Land in Kirajuku. She's a celeb type idol, her theme color is navy blue and her preferred brand is Moonlight Magic.

Other idols

The manager of Dear Crown and the mentor to Ring Marry. Around the earlier parts of season 2, Dear Crown exploded with popularity among customers, leaving Prism Stone in the dust, as a result, Meganee referred Naru as a rival. On the other hand, Naru was frightened of her but wanted to be friends with her nonetheless. It was revealed that Naru became a manager because of her admiration for Meganee, and the two finally reconciles and started to get along starting from episode 75. Naru also wrote the book "The Princess of the Jewel Kingdom", which inspired Nijinosaki to create Jewel Auditions. She is the parallel version of Naru Ayase from Pretty Rhythm: Rainbow Live.

A Super Cute Idol who is an owner of Dreamy Rice area. Much like the original Yui's personality, she is super optimistic, hard-working, and energetic. She still retains using "yume" in her sentences but says "super cute" (Gekikawa) instead of "dreamy-cute" (Yumekawa) as one of her catchphrases. She is the parallel version of Yui Yumekawa from Idol Time PriPara.

GOGO! MASCOTS 

Miracle☆Kiratts' mascot. Originally designed by Mirai, she gained the power of the virtual world from Daia and also became a navigator in the Design Palette. When Pri☆Chan Land opened, she moved to the PriTama GO and evolved further, working hard as Miracle☆Kiratts' mascot to support them. Her sentence-ender is "~cchu".

Meltic StAr's mascot. She's a level-headed and responsible person and a self-proclaimed, competent mascot of Meltic StAr. For other mascots, she tends to take up the leadership position and looks down upon other from the top, but is it because of her companions? Her sentence-ender is "~pan".

Ring Marry's mascot. A mysterious mascot, who sometimes appears in front of Mirai. She's usually seen alone while searching for her master. In episode 115, she becomes the official mascot of Ring Marry. Her sentence-ender is "~rabbi".

ALIVE's Mascots 

Alice's mascot. At a glance, she speaks and looks like a boy while having a cold presence, but she quietly watches over Alice. For most of Season 3, Solulu's memories were lost, not even knowing that the she was the one who aided Alice in her Illuminage Live and also the one who saved her performance in episode 128. After she regains her memory in episode 141, she recalls Luluna being the one to have erased her memories as well as how she and Alice ended up at a circus. In Episode 149, Solulu now cooperates with Luluna to take over Pri☆Chan Land for Luluna's ideal vision of Pri☆Chan, but in episode 151, it was revealed that Solulu's true reason for bringing Luluna back was because she needed Luluna's help in stopping the bug hole that threatens to wipe out Pri☆Chan. She and Luluna flies into the space to confront the bug hole, sacrificing themselves in the process. With Pri☆Chan are restored once and for all, Solulu and Luluna disappeared, showing what appears to be a constellation of their Petite Mascot forms.

Eve's mascot. She's always by Eve's side and is supportive like a secretary. She has a stoic and serious personality and she is also a "Mascot of High Position", as she manages mascot-related things pertaining to Pri☆Chan Land. In episode 141, Luluna reveals her true intention to create a world where mascots dominate and control everything by allowing for Pri☆Chan Land to spread around the world to ensure a brighter future for the world. However, in episode 150, she becomes cold, stern and sentient, and decided to take it upon herself to take over Pri☆Chan Land and created a new Pri☆Chan into a state of perfection where everything is dictated by strict rules, regulations, and schedules. In episode 151, after seeing the strong bond between Miracle☆Kiratts and their mascot, Luluna comes to realize what kind of bond a person and their mascot should have. Having realizes the error of her ways, Luluna apologizes with Eve for her actions before she leaves with Solulu to confront the bug hole that wipe out Pri☆Chan.

Anime-only characters

Oshama Tricks 

A troublemaker girl and a member of Oshama Tricks. She and Luu always put a pranks and tricking on their fans, often they taunts them with curses.

Devi's partner and member of Oshama Tricks.

Mascots 

Yui's mascot. Laala is shown to greatly care about Yui, going as far as to hide the unkind comments made about the Rice area's rice and also encouraging Yui to not give up. Though she believed it would only bring sadness and a lack of motivation to Yui, she came to realize that hiding it will stunt Yui's growth. She is a parallel version of Laala Manaka in the PriPara anime series.

Oshama Tricks' mascot who is a rogue malware bug that created from the virtual world. It is rude, mischievous and troublemaker, as shown when it displays great joy and little terror in causing bugs in the virtual world's system to going out of control. In Season 2, it attempted to take over Pri☆Chan by hacking the Pri☆Chan satellite, which would have resulted in the malfunction of Pri☆Chan, but it defeated by Daia, which caused a damage to her system. However in Season 3, BugcCHU has become the mascot for Oshama Tricks.

Rinka's self created mascot. She was originally designed for the purpose of creating a mascot for the Cute Festival in episode 33.

Anju's mascot as well as assistant. She is also the designer of the brand Little Princess Egg and the member of Designers Thirteen.

Others 

The manager of the Prism Stone Shop. She is a recurring parallel character from Pretty Rhythm and PriPara anime series.

Rinka's older brother, who works at the Prism Stone Shop as a cameraman, then the manager of Dear Crown by Season 3. He was also a member of Arrows before he left for the group cause an unknown reasons. He is often scolded by Meganee.

Meganee's partner, who works as a tour guide at the Pri☆Chan Land as well as an announcer of the Princess Cup in Season 3. It was revealed in episode 140 that Meganii is the Prism Stone's store mascot, which is slightly different from mascots such as KiracCHU. He is also a recurring parallel character from PriPara anime series.

Mirai's classmates across all three years in middle school.

, 

Yuzuru's former teammates, who are members of male idol group Arrows.

Media

Arcade game
Pri☆Chan arcade game were launched on April 19, 2018. It was developed by syn Sophia and published by Takara Tomy. A player can create a character and progress by performing live shows.

Anime

Episode 68 featured a crossover television special with Secret × Heroine Phantomirage! Episode 118 is a special episode to honor ten years of the Pretty series featuring Pretty All Friends idols. On April 25, 2020, it was announced that episode 107 and later episodes would be delayed due to the ongoing COVID-19 pandemic. On June 26, 2020, it was announced that the anime would resume on July 5, 2020, with episode 107. Crunchyroll licensed the series.

Manga
A manga adaptation by Hitsuji Tsujinaga began serialization in Shogakukan's shōjo manga magazine Ciao in April 2018.

Music

References

2018 anime television series debuts
Crunchyroll anime
Japanese idols in anime and manga
Shogakukan manga
Shōjo manga
TV Tokyo original programming
Anime postponed due to the COVID-19 pandemic
Anime productions suspended due to the COVID-19 pandemic